The Lynd River is a river located on the Cape York Peninsula in Far North Queensland, Australia.

Course and features
The headwaters of the river rise in the Forty Mile Scrub National Park  in the Great Dividing Range and flows in a north westerly direction. It flows down the range and onto the plains of the Gulf Country past cattle stations such Torwood, The Lake outstation and Bulimba. Continuing north it discharges into the Mitchell River near Staaten River National Park. From source to mouth, the Lynd River is joined by twenty tributaries including the Tate River, descending  over its  course. In its upper reaches, the river is crossed by the Kennedy Highway.

The Mitchell River Fan Aggregation, a  freshwater wetland area located approximately south east of Kowanyama, is fed by the Mitchell, Palmer and Lynd Rivers.
 
Riparian vegetation found along the river include Melaleuca fluviatilis, Casuarina cunninghamiana, Pandanus spiralis and Ficus racemosa which provide most of the cover.

The traditional owners of the upper catchment area are the Kunjen peoples.

Etymology
The river was named in 1844 in honour of Lieutenant Robert Lynd of the 63rd Regiment of the British Army by Ludwig Leichhardt during Leichhardt's expedition from Queensland to Port Essington. Lynd was a benefactor of Leichhardt's, and assisted him both socially and financially. William Hann also passed through the area as part of his 1872 expedition camping along the river before moving on to the Palmer River.

See also

List of rivers of the Queensland

References 

Rivers of Far North Queensland